Ryabchenko is a Ukrainian surname. Notable people with the surname include:

 Stepan Ryabchenko (born 1987), Ukrainian new media artist
 Tetyana Ryabchenko (born 1989), Ukrainian racing cyclist
 Vasiliy Ryabchenko (born 1954), Ukrainian painter and photographer
 Viktor Ryabchenko (born 1982), Kazakhstani alpine skier

See also
 

Ukrainian-language surnames